Mochammad Sandy Ferizal (born 17 May 1999) is an Indonesian professional footballer who plays as a full-back for Liga 2 club Persela Lamongan.

Club career

Barito Putera
Ferizal made his professional debut in the Liga 1 for Barito Putera on 11 July 2018, in a 0–0 to Arema at the 17th May Stadium, Banjarmasin.

Arema
He was signed for Arema to play in 2021 Menpora Cup.

Persela Lamongan
He was signed for Persela Lamongan to play in Liga 1. Ferizal made his league debut on 17 September 2021 in a match against Persita Tangerang at the Pakansari Stadium, Cibinong.

Career statistics

Club

Notes

References

External links
 
 Sandy Ferizal at Liga Indonesia

1999 births
Living people
Indonesian footballers
Association football fullbacks
Liga 1 (Indonesia) players
Liga 2 (Indonesia) players
Persela Lamongan players
Arema F.C. players
PS Barito Putera players
Sportspeople from Malang